The 1999 San Francisco mayoral election was held on November 2, 1999, with a runoff election held on December 14, 1999. Incumbent mayor Willie Brown won reelection against supervisor and current Assemblyman Tom Ammiano and nine other candidates for a second term as Mayor of San Francisco.

There is a documentary about the election titled See How They Run.

Results

References

External links 
 San Francisco Department of Elections

1999
1999 California elections
San Francisco
1999 in San Francisco